The 2014 season for  began in January with the Tour Down Under. As a UCI ProTeam, they were automatically invited and obligated to send a squad to every event in the UCI World Tour.

Oleg Tinkov bought Saxo–Tinkoff from Bjarne Riis and will be the main sponsor for the squad for the next three years. The team will be known as Tinkoff–Saxo in 2014 with Danish Saxo Bank becoming the second sponsor.

2014 roster

Riders who joined the team for the 2014 season

Riders who left the team during or after the 2013 season

Season victories

Footnotes

References

2014 road cycling season by team
Tinkoff (cycling team)
2014 in Danish sport
2014 in Russian sport